Ivanovskoye is a rural locality (a village) in Andreyevskoye Rural Settlement, Alexandrovsky District, Vladimir Oblast, Russia. The population was 16 as of 2010.

Geography 
The village is located 19 km north-east from Alexandrov.

References 

Rural localities in Alexandrovsky District, Vladimir Oblast